The 2014 season was BEC Tero Sasana's 18th season in the Thai Premier League.

Pre-season and friendlies

Thai Premier League

Thai FA Cup
Chang FA Cup

Thai League Cup
Toyota League Cup

Squad statistics

Transfers

In

Out

Loan in

Loan out

References

2014
Bec Tero Sasana